Vrh nad Laškim is a settlement in the Municipality of Laško in eastern Slovenia. It lies in the hills southeast of Laško. The area is part of the traditional region of Styria. It is now included with the rest of the municipality in the Savinja Statistical Region.

Name
The name of the settlement was changed from Vrh to Vrh nad Laškim in 1953.

Church

The parish church in the settlement is dedicated to Saint Leonard and belongs to the Roman Catholic Diocese of Celje. It was built in 1738 and extended in the 19th century.

References

External links
Vrh nad Laškim on Geopedia

Populated places in the Municipality of Laško